Heads Will Roll may refer to:

Heads Will Roll (EP), 2006 extended play by Marion Raven
"Heads Will Roll" (song), 2009 song by Yeah Yeah Yeahs
"Heads Will Roll", song by Echo & the Bunnymen from Porcupine (album)
"Heads Will Roll", song by Ted Nugent from Intensities in 10 Cities
"Heads Will Roll", song by Marion Raven from Set Me Free (Marion Raven album)
"Heads Will Roll" (Under the Dome), episode of television series Under the Dome
Heads Will Roll (podcast), 2019 audio production by Audible